Jazz à Vienne is a Jazz Festival in Vienne, Isère, near Lyon, France.

The festival has been held since 1981 in the months of June and July for two weeks. Every evening during the festival, there are concerts in the ancient Roman theater of Vienne. Among the performers there have been musicians such as Miles Davis, Stan Getz, Michel Petrucciani, Ella Fitzgerald, Sonny Rollins, Lionel Hampton, Dee Dee Bridgewater, Chuck Berry, Ike Turner, Céline Bonacina, Joe Zawinul, or Brad Mehldau. Many musicians have returned, like Herbie Hancock who has already performed more than a dozen times in Vienne. In addition to the main concerts there are smaller concerts on other stages in the city, as well as concerts in pubs and musical moves.

See also 
 List of jazz festivals

External links 
 

Jazz festivals in France
Culture of Auvergne-Rhône-Alpes